Palema is a rural locality (a selo) in Pokrovskoye Rural Settlement, Velikoustyugsky District, Vologda Oblast, Russia. The population was 40 as of 2002.

Geography 
Palema is located 45 km southeast of Veliky Ustyug (the district's administrative centre) by road. Korolyovo is the nearest rural locality.

References 

Rural localities in Velikoustyugsky District